The Victorian Railways L class was a class of electric locomotives built by English Electric and operated by the Victorian Railways and later V/Line from 1953 until 1987 primarily on the Gippsland line. They were the only class of main line electric locomotive operated in Victoria.

History
Australia was a relatively early adopter of electric traction and Electric Multiple Unit trains, with a General Electric advertisement in Railway Age magazine of 1924 claiming that Melbourne had the largest suburban electrification scheme in the world at 346 miles (557 km). However, electrification in Victoria had until the 1950s been restricted to the Melbourne suburban network. Apart from the EMU fleet the only electric locomotives operated by the Victorian Railways (VR) were a fleet of 12 small 620 hp (460 kW) types (two steeple cabs 1100 and 1101 plus ten box cabs 1102 to 1111). In the 1960s the latter became classified E class. They were all built in the 1920s at VR's Newport Workshops for suburban goods service, using the same General Electric traction motors and electrical equipment employed on Melbourne's EMU fleet.

During the early 1950s, VR embarked on an £80 million program dubbed Operation Phoenix to rebuild a network badly run down by years of Depression-era underinvestment and wartime overutilisation. This included a substantial upgrade (regrading, rerouting and electrification) of the Gippsland line servicing Victoria's substantial brown coal fields in the Latrobe Valley to allow for greatly increased traffic in briquettes for industrial use. A suitably powerful electric locomotive was sought for both express passenger and heavy freight use on the upgraded, electrified line.

Production
In-house locomotive production by VR had virtually ceased with the last of the N class locomotives in 1951, and an order was placed with English Electric in England for 25 locomotives. All were built at the Dick, Kerr & Co workshops in Stafford. The first two arrived in Australia in January 1953, entering service the following month on suburban Melbourne freight services pending the completion of the Gippsland line electrification. The RENFE Class 277 is a similar design.

Classleader L1150 entered service on 21 April 1953 on a Sunday excursion train to Warburton as far as Lilydale. The final locomotive L1174 entered service on 3 August 1954. Because the electrification scheme was not completed until 1956, 12 were stored at Newport Workshops.

Design features
The L class design reflected a compromise between a requirement to haul freight loads of up to 1,400 tons up a 1 in 110 gradient, and a requirement for a low axle load in consideration of VR's typically lightly laid line infrastructure. Although English Electric recommended a heavier locomotive, VR engineers argued against anything above a 97 ton maximum.

In order to achieve the required weight reductions, a series of novel weight-saving measures were taken. The original round-ended nose design (which was to have resembled the EMD F7 nose used on the B class Diesel) was shortened and squared off to allow the frame to be reduced in size and weight, reducing the depth of the cabs and requiring the driver to enter the cab via the engine room. Masonite was used in place of sheet metal to line the cab interior, and acrylic sheet was used in place of glass on some of the cab windows.

The L class locomotive was also fitted with what was believed to be the most powerful dynamic brake in the world at the time, with L1150 able to maintain a steady 32 mph (51 km/h) leading a 1,100 ton test train on a 1 in 50 down-grade without use of the air brake. They were built with gauge convertible bogies to allow them to operate on standard gauge.

L class locomotives were capable of multiple unit operation, but only with other L class locomotives.

Regular service
In terms of power, the L class outclassed most of the VR fleet when introduced in 1953, surpassed only by steam locomotive H220. L1150 was able to better the performance of the famed S class in hauling a 600 ton load up the 1 in 50 gradient of Glenroy Bank. The L was also able to haul an 1,100 ton load between Dandenong and Oakleigh stations in around half the time taken by VR's most powerful freight locomotive, the X class, allowing heavy freight trains from Gippsland to avoid delaying suburban passenger services sharing the same route.

From introduction the class were maintained at the Jolimont Workshops in central Melbourne, along with the suburban multiple unit fleet and the E class suburban freight locomotives, as steam locomotives were housed at the North Melbourne Locomotive Depot. They were not moved to the new South Dynon Locomotive Depot until 1964.

The L class proved to be a fine locomotive for express passenger service where their high power output was put to good use hauling The Gippslander and other services at the line speed limit of 70 mph (112 km/h). However in heavy freight service they were somewhat less successful, as their relatively light weight and low factor of adhesion caused them to slip on heavy loads. Despite this, they were regularly used to haul heavy briquette trains of over 1,000 tons from the Latrobe Valley to Melbourne. They could also be seen on some suburban freight services.

L class locomotives were equipped with two pantographs. The VR issued instructions for both pantographs to be raised in winter months, with the first pantograph serving to knock ice off the overhead catenary and ensure good contact for the second pantograph.

Accidents
The L class locomotives became known as "The Whispering Death" during their early years due to accidents attributed to their quietness of operation in comparison to the various Diesel locomotives operated by the VR at the time. A number of track workers were killed or seriously injured by L class locomotives whose rapid approach they were unable to hear until it was too late.

In early 1984, L1164 failed at Hernes Oak and was struck by the relief locomotive and withdrawn. In 1985, L1163 was involved in a derailment near Drouin after hitting a broken rail at 70 mph. The locomotive dug into the ballast and rotated through 180 degrees before rolling down an embankment. Remarkably, the crew climbed from the wreckage without serious injury and the derailed passenger carriages remained upright on the embankment, avoiding loss of life and serious injury among the passengers.

Demise
Because only one major line (the Gippsland line) had been electrified, the economic advantages of electric traction were not fully realised due to the need to change locomotives for trains that extended beyond the range of the electrified network, which added to the overall cost per mile. Furthermore, the additional expense associated with maintaining the 1,500 V DC overhead catenary system saw V/Line move to withdraw the L class from service and dewire the Gippsland line beyond Pakenham. The L class fleet were withdrawn from service by June 1987.

Preservation
Four L class locomotives have survived into preservation, all based at Newport Workshops:

L1150 RG Wishart is in static preservation at the Newport Railway Museum in Champion Road, Williamstown North, painted in VR royal blue and gold livery.
L1160 is owned by Steamrail Victoria and is currently in storage, painted in 1980s tangerine and grey V/Line livery. It is unlikely to be restored. 
L1162 is owned by Steamrail Victoria, restored to operating condition in February 1998, including a repaint in VR livery. It has only been used occasionally within the confines of the Steamrail Depot.
L1169 is owned by Steamrail Victoria and is currently stored. It was used as a prop for the 2007 movie Ghost Rider and specially painted in a Texas Eagle livery for the film production. As of March 2020, the Texan Eagle livery has finally begun to fade, revealing the V/Line orange and grey underneath. A few months later it was repainted into an orange with yellow stripe livery for the Apple series Shantaram.

Model Railways
HO Scale
As of February 2015, only HO scale plastic models of the L Class are available produced by Auscision Models.

Numbers and Liveries as Follows

Victorian Railways Blue and Gold: L1150 "R.G Wishart", L1156, L1157, L1158, L1170 and L1174

Victorian Railways Blue and Gold with the Staff Exchanger plated over: L1165

Vicrail "Teacup" Orange and Tangerine: L1150 "R.G Wishart"

V/Line All Orange: L1156

V/Line Orange and Grey: L1150 "R.G Wishart"

V/Line Orange and Grey with Large Stripe: L1156 and L1160

Gallery

References

External links 
 L class locomotive diagrams
 Victorian Railways, Museum Victoria, Australia: L Class Electric Locos
 VR Photo Gallery 02/12, victorianrailways.net Photograph of L 1165 on a passenger service in December 1986, shortly before withdrawal and later scrapping
 Berwick, victorianrailways.net Photograph of later "Ghost Rider" locomotive L 1169 on a goods train at Berwick, Victoria in 1976.

Co-Co locomotives
Electric locomotives of Australia
English Electric locomotives
Railway locomotives introduced in 1953
L class (electric)
1500 V DC locomotives
Broad gauge locomotives in Australia